Klaus Schmidt (born 21 October 1967) is an Austrian football manager.

Coaching career
On 2 September 2019 he was hired by Admira Wacker.

On 7 March 2022, Schmidt signed a 1.5-year contract with TSV Hartberg. He was dismissed on 14 November 2022.

References

External links
 
 
 Klaus Schmidt at Footballdatabase

1967 births
Living people
Footballers from Graz
Austrian football managers
SK Austria Kärnten managers
Kapfenberger SV managers
SV Austria Salzburg managers
FC Wacker Innsbruck (2002) managers
FC Blau-Weiß Linz managers
SV Mattersburg managers
FC Admira Wacker Mödling managers
TSV Hartberg managers
Austrian Football Bundesliga managers
Australian expatriate sportspeople in the United Arab Emirates
Association football coaches
Australian expatriate sportspeople in Bahrain